Abbadia San Salvatore is a comune (municipality) in the Province of Siena in the Italian region Tuscany, located about  southeast of Florence and about  southeast of Siena, in the area of Monte Amiata.

The town is named after the Abbey of the same name. The area was once important for the extraction of cinnabar. Attractions in the town include the medieval borough, the Palazzo della Potesta (15th century) and the church of Santa Croce.

Abbadia San Salvatore borders the following municipalities: Castel del Piano, Castiglione d'Orcia, Piancastagnaio, Radicofani, San Casciano dei Bagni, Santa Fiora, Seggiano.

References

External links
 Official website 

Cities and towns in Tuscany
Articles which contain graphical timelines